Sabina Babayeva (born 2 December 1979, Baku) is an Azerbaijani singer. She represented Azerbaijan in the grand final of the Eurovision Song Contest 2012, held in Baku, Azerbaijan on 26 May 2012, with the song "When the Music Dies", as the 13th act, and finished 4th overall.

Eurovision Song Contest 2012
A graduate of the Asaf Zeynally Music School in Baku with a degree in vocal arts, she has participated in a number of song competitions both in her country and abroad. She is known in Azerbaijan as the singer of Roya kimi, theme song of the 2003 Azerbaijani television series Bayaz hayat. A veteran contestant in the Azerbaijani national selection, she has applied to represent Azerbaijan in the Eurovision Song Contest every year since the country's debut in 2008. In 2011, she came third in her heat.

Prior to being selected, Sabina Babayeva recorded the song Sikhvarulis tamashi in duo with Anri Jokhadze who represented Georgia in the Eurovision Song Contest 2012.

As part of her promotional tour, Sabina performed in London, Amsterdam and Budapest. At Eurovision, she came in fourth, the highest rank for a host country contestant since the introduction of the semi-finals. She also received the Marcel Bezençon Press Award for her performance of "When the Music Dies".

After Eurovision
In 2012, Babayeva was admitted to a post-secondary programme at the Baku Academy of Music.

In 2014, Babayeva was the spokesperson for the Azerbaijani voting for the Eurovision Song Contest 2014 in Copenhagen, Denmark.

Personal life
She considers Engelbert Humperdinck as one of her favourite singers and has expressed an interest in singing a duet with him.

On 30 July 2012, it was announced that Babayeva had got engaged to Javidan Sharifov, six years her junior, a program director on Ictimai TV and former participant of the reality show Gafas. The couple was reported to have been dating for a year. Sabina Babayeva refuted the claim but despite her initial reaction, the wedding did take place on 26 September. In early 2016, Babayeva gave birth to a son.

Achievements and awards 
 A laureate of 1st award in nomination for the best rendering of foreign song in local competition  ”Wave” among musical institutions in 1999.
 A laureate of international contest of young vocal performers “Golden Hit’99” 
 A Diploma for the participation in Charity Concerts dedicated to the International Day of Innocent Children victims of aggression and UN Program for the International year of Culture of Peace‘2000. 
 In 2002 was invited to LAMA (los-angeles music academy) on vocal department
 A laureate of the 1st premium of international festival dedicated to 55th years passed from World War
 A laureate of 1st premium in Republic Contest of young singers"Golden Key 2001” 
 Grand-prix of International contest of young performers “Amberstar 2009” in Latvia – Stokholm
 A Grand-prix  of International contest of young performers named “Slavic Star’2009”
 A performer of soundtrack “Like a Dream” in a 10 parts “White Life” Movie . 
 A soloist in Aypara music vocal instrumental group
 A soloist in Baku jazz club
 A soloist in musical “Noterdam De Pari“ 2010- 2011
 A representer of Azerbaijan at culture week in Paris ‘2011
 A representer of Azerbaijan at culture week in Washington’2013
 A representer of Azerbaijan at culture week in Cannes ‘2013
 A representer of Azerbaijan at culture week in Vilnus ‘2013
 A representer at Eurovision song contest 2012 (4-d place Azerbaijan) (video)
 Live concert in Moscow “Zaferano” club and Baku “11” club 2012
 A “Voice of year’2012 ” nomination given by the Ministry of Youth and Sport of Azerbaijan Respublic
 A special guest at close ceremony of Islamic games 2017

Discography 

 Sabina Babayeva (2001) [1] [2]
 Roya kimi (OTS) - Sabina Babayeva (2003) [1] [2] [3] [4] 
 Duets - Sabina Babayeva (2009) [1] [2]
 When the music dies - Sabina Babayeva (Eurovision-2012) [1] [2] [3] [4] [5] [6] [7] [8] [9]
 Retro - Sabina (2012) [1]
 Ey Azerbaycanim - Sabina Babayeva (2013) [1] [2]
 Geca - Sabina (2014) [1]
 Oceans away - Sabina Babayeva (2014) [1] [2] [3]
 Out Of Love - DJ AKG & Sabina Babayeva (2014) [1]

See also
Azerbaijani folk music
Azerbaijani pop music
Azerbaijani jazz

References

Eurovision Song Contest entrants for Azerbaijan
21st-century Azerbaijani women singers
Azerbaijani women pop singers
Azerbaijani jazz singers
Eurovision Song Contest entrants of 2012
1979 births
Musicians from Baku
English-language singers from Azerbaijan
Living people